Pogorzelica  is a village in the administrative district of Gmina Rewal, within Gryfice County, West Pomeranian Voivodeship, in northwestern Poland. Situated on the Trzebiatowski Coast of the Baltic Sea in the historic region of Pomerania, the village has a beach and is a holiday resort.

It borders with the village of Niechorze in the west, and Pogorzelica, Gmina Karnice in the south.

The village has a population of 119.

Gallery

References

External links
 Pogorzelica - Photo Gallery
 Pogorzelica - Pogorzelica na portalu polska-org.pl

Populated coastal places in Poland
Seaside resorts in Poland
Villages in Gryfice County